Sokolovići may refer to:

Sokolovići, Sokolac, Bosnia and Herzegovina
Sokolovići, Rudo, a settlement in Rudo, Republika Srpska, Bosnia and Herzegovina

See also
 Sokolović, surname
 Sokolić, surname
 Sokolovac (disambiguation)
 Sokolovo (disambiguation)
 Sokolov (disambiguation)
 Sokol (disambiguation)
 Soko (disambiguation)